A tank is an armoured combat vehicle. 

Tank or tanking may also refer to:

Geographical names

Oceania
 Tank Stream, New South Wales, Australia

Asia
 Tank (city), Khyber Pakhtunkhwa, Pakistan
 Tank District, Khyber Pakhtunkhwa, Pakistan
 Tank Tehsil, Khyber Pakhtunkhwa, Pakistan
 Tank Subdivision, Khyber Pakhtunkhwa, Pakistan
 Bandar-e Tang, also known as Tank, village in Iran

North America
 Tank Mountains, Arizona, United States
 Tank Pond, body of water in Nova Scotia, Canada
 Tanks Peak, Colorado, United States

People

Surname
 Tank (surname), or Taunk, a surname of India
 Jennifer Tank, American ecologist
 Kurt Tank (1898–1983), German aerospace engineer and test pilot
 Manisha Tank (born 1976), CNN International presenter
 Walter Tank (1897–1978), American politician

Stage name
 Tank (American singer), American R&B singer Durrell Babbs (born 1976)
 Tank (German singer), Eric Geisenheyner (born 1977)
 Tank (Taiwanese singer), singer/songwriter Lü Jianzhong (born 1982)
 Tank Palamara (born 1968), Italian rock guitarist Tancredi Palamara

Other people
 Tank (nickname)
 Tank Man, Chinese man arrested for standing in front of Chinese tanks
 Tank or Tanche (family), in Denmark and Norway

Arts, entertainment, and media

Fictional entities
 Tank (gaming), a role in video games, often a character designed to withstand damage
 Tank (Gobots), a character from the Gobots toy line
 Tank (The Matrix), a minor character from The Matrix
 Michael "Tank" Ellis, a character in the Canadian-American television series Captain Power and the Soldiers of the Future
 Tank, the title character of the comic strip Tank McNamara
 "The Tank", a character from the Left 4 Dead video game series

Music

Groups
 Tank (band), British heavy metal band

Albums
 Tank (album), by Asian Dub Foundation
 Kreidler Tank, by Kreidler

Songs
 "Tank" (song), an instrumental by Emerson, Lake & Palmer on their 1970 eponymous album
 "Tank!", the opening song for the anime series Cowboy Bebop
 "Tank" (Nmixx song), a song by South Korean girl group NMIXX
 "Tank", a song by The Stranglers from Black and White

Video games
 Tank (video game), a 1974 arcade game by Kee Games
 Tank! Tank! Tank!, a video game
 TNK III (1984 video game), a video game that was released in Japan as "T.A.N.K."

Other arts, entertainment, and media
 Tank (film), a 1984 movie starring James Garner
 Tank (magazine), a British quarterly
 The Tank (theater), performance space in Manhattan, New York

Brands and enterprises
 Cartier Tank, a watch line by Cartier
 Film Tank, a multi-award-winning film production company in the UK
 TANK (marque), a Chinese automotive marque, specialises in SUVs

Organizations
 Think tank, an organization that performs research and advocacy
 Transit Authority of Northern Kentucky, a public transit company in Northern Kentucky

Storage vessels
 Tank, another word for a gas cylinder
 Flexible tanks
 Fuel tank, also called a "gas tank" or "petrol tank"
 Storage tank, a container, usually for liquids
 Water tank, a container for storing liquid
 Pond, specifically artificial ponds created by directing water runoff

Other uses
 TANK (gene)
 Tank (goddess), in ancient North Africa
 Tank (unit), an obsolete unit of measure in India
 LC circuit, also called a tank circuit
 Mitzvah tank, a large vehicle used as a portable educational and outreach center and mini-synagogue
 Tank Cottage, Green Bay, Wisconsin, on the US National Register of Historic Places
 Tank Upper Secondary School, a secondary school in Bergen, Norway
 Irrigation tank, part of a tank cascade system of naturalized water reservoirs in South Asia
 Tank car, a railroad car
Tanking (sports), a strategy of sports teams intentionally fielding losing teams in order to gain benefits that pay off later
Aerial refueling, sometimes known as buddy tanking
Tanking, a method of wet rendering; see Rendering (animal products)

See also
 Tank top (disambiguation)
 
 
 Tanker (disambiguation)